The Countess's Calamity is a children's book written and illustrated by Sally Gardner, published in 2003. It won the Nestlé Smarties Book Prize Bronze Award. It is the first of the Tales from the Box series about sentient toys.

Plot summary
After a box of toys is abandoned at a park, the intervention of some friendly mice helps the toys go on with their lives. One of the dolls, the Countess, has trouble adapting.

References

External links
The Countess's Calamity at Fantastic Fiction

2003 British novels
2003 children's books
British children's novels
Children's fantasy novels
Sentient toys in fiction
Bloomsbury Publishing books